Yokota may refer to:

 6656 Yokota, an asteroid
 Yokota Shōkai, a Japanese film company

Places 
 Yokota Air Base, a US Air Force Base located in Tokyo, Japan
 Harima-Yokota Station
 Iyo-Yokota Station
 Yokota, Shimane
 Izumo Yokota Station
 Iwami-Yokota Station

People with the surname 
 Yokota family (born 1930s)
 Jaguar Yokota (born 1961), professional wrestler
 Jun'ya Yokota (1945–2019), science fiction writer and cultural historian
 Katsumi Yokota, video game designer 
 Kazuyoshi Yokota (?–2011), anime director
, Japanese rhythmic gymnast
 Mahito Yokota, video game composer
 Mamoru Yokota, anime illustrator
 Masato Yokota (born 1987), athlete
 Megumi Yokota (born 1964), Japanese national abducted by North Korea
 Misao Yokota (born 1917), freestyle swimmer
, Japanese table tennis player
 Shigeaki Yokota (born 1969), professional Go player
, Japanese house music producer
 Susumu Yokota (?–2015), composer
 Tadayoshi Yokota (born 1947), volleyball player 
 Takatoshi Yokota (1487–1550), samurai
 Toshifumi Yokota, Japanese medical scientist and professor of medical genetics 
 Yoshimi P-We (Yoshimi Yokota, born 1968), musician

Japanese-language surnames